Billolivia is a genus of flowering plants belonging to the family Gesneriaceae.

Its native range is Vietnam.

Species:

Billolivia cadamensis 
Billolivia citrina 
Billolivia kyi 
Billolivia longipetiolata 
Billolivia middletonii 
Billolivia minutiflora 
Billolivia moelleri 
Billolivia noanii 
Billolivia poilanei 
Billolivia tichii 
Billolivia truciae 
Billolivia vietnamensis 
Billolivia violacea 
Billolivia yenhoae

References

Didymocarpoideae
Gesneriaceae genera